The Boise Capitol Area District in Boise, Idaho, is an area of Downtown Boise that includes current and former government buildings, a former hotel, one cathedral, and one monument. The district was added to the National Register of Historic Places in 1976.

Buildings
 Idaho State Capitol (1912, 1919, 1920)
 Old Ada County Courthouse (1939)
 Old Federal Building (1904)
 Hotel Boise (Hoff Building) (1930)
 Steunenberg Monument (1929)
 St. Michael's Cathedral (1902)
 Christian Science Building (1910), demolished
 Milton Building (1904), demolished

References

External links

National Register of Historic Places in Ada County, Idaho
Historic districts on the National Register of Historic Places in Idaho